Hamburg is a city and county seat of Ashley County, Arkansas, United States. The population was 2,857 at the 2010 census. It is best known for being the home town of NBA legend Scottie Pippen.

Geography
Hamburg is located at  (33.227369, -91.798472).

Climate
The climate in this area is characterized by hot, humid summers and generally mild to cool winters.  According to the Köppen Climate Classification system, Hamburg has a humid subtropical climate, abbreviated "Cfa" on climate maps.

Demographics

2020 census

As of the 2020 United States census, there were 2,536 people, 1,104 households, and 715 families residing in the city.

2000 census
At the 2000 census there were 3,039 people in 1,158 households, including 802 families, in the city. The racial makeup of the city was 60.32% White, 33.63% Black or African American, 0.36% Native American, 0.13% Asian, 0.10% Pacific Islander, 3.62% from other races, and 1.84% from two or more races.  6.55% of the population were Hispanic or Latino of any race.
Of the 1,158 households 33.6% had children under the age of 18 living with them, 49.7% were married couples living together, 16.0% had a female householder with no husband present, and 30.7% were non-families. 27.7% of households were one person and 15.1% were one person aged 65 or older.  The average household size was 2.55 and the average family size was 3.12.

The age distribution was 27.9% under the age of 18, 7.9% from 18 to 24, 26.5% from 25 to 44, 20.4% from 45 to 64, and 17.3% 65 or older.  The median age was 37 years. For every 100 females, there were 89.9 males.  For every 100 females age 18 and over, there were 84.4 males.

The median household income was $26,189 and the median family income was $36,875. Males had a median income of $28,696 versus $20,750 for females. The per capita income for the city was $14,599.  About 20.8% of families and 25.2% of the population were below the poverty line, including 35.1% of those under age 18 and 19.9% of those age 65 or over.

Culture
Hamburg is home-base to the Armadillo Festival, held the first weekend in May since 1970.
 
In April 1855, a local slave Abby Guy sued for her freedom and a trial was held in Hamburg. A jury of twelve white men found in her favor and set her free, but the decision was reversed by the Arkansas Supreme Court. Two more jury trials were then held and she was eventually freed.

Government
The current mayor of Hamburg is David Streeter.  Former mayors include Dane Weindorf, Maxwell Hill, Thomas Crow Hundley, and Gordon Hennington.

Education
Public education for elementary and secondary school students is provided by the Hamburg School District, which is one of the two public school districts in Ashley County. In 2012, Hamburg High School was nationally recognized as a Silver Medalist and the No. 1737 (national rank) and No. 14 (state rank) in the Best High Schools Report developed by U.S. News & World Report.

Notable people
 Harry Kane (born Harry Cohen), Major League Baseball pitcher from 1902 - 1906 for the St. Louis Browns, the Detroit Tigers and the Philadelphia Phillies, compiling a 2 - 7 record.
 Carroll E. Lanier, mayor of Alexandria, Louisiana, from 1977 to 1982, born in Hamburg in 1926
 Van H. Manning, Confederate States Army colonel and U.S. Representative from Mississippi, practiced law in Hamburg in 1861
 The Martins, Gospel trio
 Stevi Perry, Miss Arkansas Teen USA 2008, Miss Teen USA 2008
 Scottie Pippen, NBA basketball player for the Chicago Bulls, Houston Rockets, and Portland Trail Blazers, six-time NBA champion, two-time Olympic gold medalist and a member of the Basketball Hall of Fame, born in Hamburg in 1965.
 Charles Portis, author of True Grit

References

External links
 Hamburg Area Chamber of Commerce

Cities in Ashley County, Arkansas
Cities in Arkansas
County seats in Arkansas